This list of Japanese gardens in the United States contains gardens, museums, institutions and other organizations which features gardens designed and created in traditional Japanese style that are open to the public.

Gardens

References
  Japanese Garden Research Network: Japanese gardens in the U.S.

 
Japanese gardens
United States, Japanese gardens

External links 

Map of Japanese Gardens in the United States
List of Japanese Gardens by State in the United States